Khalid ibn Abdallah ibn Khalid ibn Asid (fl. 683–712) was an Umayyad prince and statesman who served as governor of Basra in 692–693 during the reign of Caliph Abd al-Malik.

Life
He was the son of Abdallah ibn Khalid ibn Asid and belonged to the line of the Banu Umayya clan descended from Asid ibn Abi al-Is. He was based in Basra. At the beginning of the Second Muslim Civil War, during which Umayyad authority had collapsed in Iraq, Khalid threw in his lot with Mus'ab ibn al-Zubayr, who had been appointed governor of Basra by his brother Abd Allah ibn al-Zubayr, the rival caliph to the Umayyads. 

Khalid later defected to his kinsman, Caliph Abd al-Malik, who was based in Damascus, and who appointed him governor of Basra despite it being under Musab’s control. Khalid gained support among several horsemen from the Banu Bakr tribe, led by Malik ibn Misma, and established himself at a place in Basra’s environs called al-Jufra, hence the name of his faction, the Jufriyya. In 688/89 or 689/90, Khalid and the Jufriyya revolted against the Zubayrids, but the latter quashed the pro-Umayyad rebels and Musab subsequently dealt severe punishments against the troops associated with the movement. Khalid was present at the Battle of Maskin in which Musab was killed in 692. Afterward, he was again appointed governor of Basra. As leader of Basra’s troops, he took charge of the campaign to subdue the Azariqa, a Kharijite faction, taking the command from al-Muhallab ibn Abi Sufra. However, he proved to be incapable of the task and was dismissed from the governorship in favor of the caliph’s brother, Bishr ibn Marwan, who was also unsuccessful and died in 694. Later, in 711/12, Khalid was appointed governor of Mecca by Caliph al-Walid I. His grandson, Uthman ibn Yazid, was a member of al-Walid's court toward the end of the latter's reign.

References

Bibliography

 

7th-century Arabs
People of the Second Fitna
Umayyad dynasty
Umayyad governors of Basra
Umayyad governors of Mecca